Love, Nina is a 2016 British comedy drama starring Faye Marsay and Helena Bonham Carter. Adapted by Nick Hornby from Nina Stibbe's book, Love, Nina: Despatches from Family Life, the series received its debut on BBC One on 20 May 2016 and ran for five episodes. Set in 1982, the series tells the story of Nina (Marsay), a 20-year-old girl from Leicester who moves to Primrose Hill, London, to work as a nanny for single mother George (Bonham Carter).

It is based on her experiences working in the household of Mary-Kay Wilmers, editor of the London Review of Books. The two boys in the series are based on her sons with filmmaker Stephen Frears, one of whom, Sam Frears, plays a neighbour. On 15 May 2017, it was made available to stream on Netflix in the UK.

Cast and characters
Faye Marsay as Nina Stibbe 
Helena Bonham Carter as George Bulut 
Jason Watkins as Malcolm Turner, a Scottish poet neighbour
Joshua McGuire as Mark Nunney, the love interest
Sam Frears as Ray, another neighbour
Ethan Rouse as Joe, younger son
Harry Webster as Max, elder son
Selina Cadell as Ursula Vaughan Williams

Broadcast
Internationally, the series debuted in Australia on BBC First on 1 November 2016.

References

External links
 

Love, Nina at BBC Media Centre

Fiction set in 1982
2016 British television series debuts
2016 British television series endings
2010s British comedy-drama television series
BBC television comedy
English-language television shows
Television series set in 1982
Television shows set in London